Manuela "Emanuela" Desvalls Vergós (died 1743), was a Spanish nun and spy. 

Desvalls Vergós was the daughter of Antoni Desvalls i de Castellbell and d’Agnès de Vergós i de Bellafilla, and the sister of Antonio Desvalls y de Vergós and Manuel Desvalls i de Vergós, governor of Cardona. Her brothers were the favorites of John of Austria the Younger, and participated on the Austrian side of Charles VI, Holy Roman Emperor, during the War of the Spanish Succession and were favored by Charles during his reign in Catalonia. 

Emanuela Desvalls Vergós was placed in the convent Santa Maria de Vallbona in 1696 and took her final vows in 1707. Until 1714, she was involved in the military activity of her brothers during the war in Catalonia, and acted as their agent. During the Siege of Barcelona, Manuela was given the task to write and copy messages to boost morale in favor of the Austrian cause, and enroll agents willing to smuggle weapons and supplies to the besieged city. After the defeat at Barcelona in 1714, her brothers left Spain for Vienna. 

Emanuela continued to write and secretly publish anti-Bourbon and pro-Austrian papers, refusing the Treaty of Utrecht and describing and challenging the repression under the Bourbon dynasty. In 1718, her pro-Austrian writings were found after the arrest of the pro-Austrian Francisco de Castellvi. There does not seem to have been any prosecutions against her. Her texts were published anonymously and are therefore difficult to verify.

References
 Diccionari biogràfic de dones Consultes
 Balaguer, V. (1863). Historia de Cataluña y de la Corona de Aragón escrita para darla a conocer al pueblo, recordándole los grandes hechos de sus ascendentes en virtud, patriotismo y armas y para difundir entre todas las clases el amor al país y la meoria de las glorias pasadas.  Barcelona, volum V, p. 216- 218, 242-243 i 247-248.
 Castellví, F. De (2002). Narraciones históricas. Edició de Josep M. Mundet i Gifre i José M. Alsina Roca. Madrid, volum IV, anys 1714-1724, p. 63-83, 271-273, 652-653.
 Piquer i Jover, J. J. (1978). Abaciologi de Vallbona (1153-1977). Santes Creus: Fundació Roger de Belfort.
 Piquer i Jover, J. J. (1978). Les exploracions de la voluntat a Vallbona durant els segles XVII i XVIII. Barcelona: Publicacions de l'Abadia de Montserrat.
 Sanpere i Miquel, Salvador (1905). Fin de la Nación Catalana. Barcelona: L’Avenç, p. 430, 450-457, 470-477, 499, 543-547, 646 i 650.

1743 deaths
18th-century Spanish nuns
Spanish spies
18th-century spies
People of the War of the Spanish Succession
18th-century Spanish writers